This is list of archives in Armenia.

Archives 

 Archive of Armenian State Architectural University
 Archive of Armenian Agrarian University
 Archive of Armenian State Institute of Physical Culture
 Archive of Armenian State Pedagogical University after Kh. Abovyan
 Archive of Republic of Armenia Courts
 Archive of the Public Library of Armenia
 Archive of the Republic of Armenia Ministry of Defense
 Archive of the Republic of Armenia president's personnel
 Archive of Yerevan Architectural-Constructing University
 Archive of Yerevan State Art Academy
 Archive of Yerevan State Economic Institute
 Archive of Yerevan State Medical University
 Archive of Yerevan State University
 Personnel archive of Armenian Civil Service Council
 Personnel archive of the Republic of Armenia Central bank
 Personnel archive of the Republic of Armenia government
 Personnel archive of the Republic of Armenia Ministry of City Building
 Personnel archive of the Republic of Armenia Ministry of Culture and Youth Issues
 Personnel archive of the Republic of Armenia Ministry of Education and Science
 Personnel archive of the Republic of Armenia Ministry of Finance and Economics
 Personnel archive of the Republic of Armenia Ministry of Nature Protection
 Personnel archive of the Republic of Armenia Ministry of Trade and Economical Development
 Personnel archive of the Republic of Armenia Ministry of Transport and Communications
 Personnel archive of the Republic of Armenia Ministry of Work and Social Questions
 Personnel archive of the Republic of Armenia National Assembly
 Personnel archive of the Republic of Armenia National Safety service
 Personnel archive of the Republic of Armenia National Statistics service
 Personnel archive of the Republic of Armenia police
 Personnel archive of the Republic of Armenia rescue service
 Personnel archive of the Republic of Armenia state customs committee
 Personnel archive of the Republic of Armenia state Fund of Social Insurance
 Personnel archive of the Republic of Armenia state committee of physical education and sports
 Personnel archive of the Republic of Armenia state taxation service
 Personnel archive of Yerevan municipality
 Republic of Armenia National Academy of Science Archive
 Republic of Armenia Procurator's office Archive
 State archive of the Republic of Armenia civil state acts registration

See also 

 List of archives
 List of museums in Armenia
 Culture of Armenia

External links 
 List of archives of state bodies and organizations in Armenia (English)

 
Archives
Armenia
Archives